Paul Gredinger (27 July 1927 – 6 October 2013) was a Swiss architect. Gredinger was one of the leading figures in the German advertising scene. He also worked between 1953 and 1957 together with Karlheinz Stockhausen and Herbert Eimert at the Studio for Electronic Music. He also practised Cubism painting.

From then on the agency traded as Gerstner, Gredinger, Kutter, or GGK. After Gerstner and Kutter retired in 1975, Gredinger took over their shares and expanded the agency into a European network with up to 20 branches. In the 1970s and 1980s, Gredinger's company was regarded as a first address for top creative professionals. Gredinger himself was the protagonist of one of the first colour ad campaigns I drink Jägermeister because... by Jägermeister.

Gredinger supported his artist friends such as Dieter Roth, André Thomkins and Donald Judd. In 1990 he sold his shares to the Swiss Trimedia. Gredinger was elected honorary member for Germany by the Art Directors Club of New York in 1992.

Gredinger died in Thalwil at the age of 86.

References

External links 
 Nachruf auf Paul Gredinger

20th-century Swiss architects
1927 births
2013 deaths
Place of birth missing